

See also 
 United States House of Representatives elections, 1798 and 1799
 List of United States representatives from Kentucky

Notes 

1799
Kentucky
United States House of Representatives